In electrochemistry, the faradaic current is the electric current generated by the reduction or oxidation of some chemical substance at an electrode. The net faradaic current is the algebraic sum of all the faradaic currents flowing through an indicator electrode or working electrode.

Limiting current
The limiting current in electrochemistry is the limiting value of a faradaic current that is approached as the rate of charge transfer to an electrode is increased. The limiting current can be approached, for example, by increasing the electric potential or decreasing the rate of mass transfer to the electrode. It is independent of the applied potential over a finite range, and is usually evaluated by subtracting the appropriate residual current from the measured total current. A limiting current can have the character of an adsorption, catalytic, diffusion, or kinetic current, and may include a migration current.

Migration current
The difference between the current that is actually obtained, at any particular value of the potential of the indicator or working electrode, for the reduction or oxidation of an ionic electroactive substance and the current that would be obtained, at the same potential, if there were no transport of that substance due to the electric field between the electrodes. The sign convention regarding current is such that the migration current is negative for the reduction of a cation or for the oxidation of an anion, and positive for the oxidation of a cation or the reduction of an anion. Hence the migration current may tend to either increase or decrease the total current observed. In any event the migration current approaches zero as the transport number of the electroactive substance is decreased by increasing the concentration of the supporting electrolyte, and hence the conductivity.

See also 
 Butler–Volmer equation
 Gas diffusion electrode

References

Electrochemistry